This is a list of supermarket chains in China.

Current supermarket chains
 ÆON (Japanese)
 Aldi (Aldi Süd, German)
 Auchan (French)
 RT-Mart (Taiwanese)
 Carrefour (French)
 Walmart (American)
 Metro Cash and Carry (German)  
 China Resources Vanguard
 CitySuper
 Hema 盒马
 JUSCO
 Lianhua Supermarket/BHG
 Lotte Mart
 Lotus Supermarket
 PARKnSHOP
 Wellcome
 Wumart
 Fulande
 Jingkelong
 Suguo
 Baozhen (Guarantee) in Hainan
 Fields
 CityShop
 Parkson
 Freshmart
 Ito Yokado (known as Huatang in Mandarin)
 Bai Hua Bai Huo 百花百货
 Feidan
 Pines
 Jenny Lou's
 Epermarket
 Ole
 Yonghui

Defunct supermarket chains

Shoulian
Trust Mart
Baolongcang
Tesco (British)

References

China
Supermarkets of China
Supermarket Chains
Supermarket chains